The men's middleweight event was part of the weightlifting programme at the 1928 Summer Olympics. The weight class was the third-lightest contested, and allowed weightlifters of up to 75 kilograms (165 pounds). The competition was held on Sunday, 29 July 1928.

Records
These were the standing world and Olympic records (in kilograms) prior to the 1928 Summer Olympics.

(*) Originally a five lift competition.

All four Olympic records were improved in this competition. Carlo Galimberti set a new world record in press with 105 kilograms. Guus Scheffer set a new world record in snatch with 105 kilograms. In the total of the three lifts at first Carlo Galimberti set a new world record with 332.5 kilograms only to be improved by Roger François with 335 kilograms.

Results

References

Sources
 Olympic Report 
 

Middleweight